Dragestil ("Dragon Style") is a style of design and architecture that originated in Norway and was widely used  principally between 1880 and 1910.  It is a variant of the more embracing National Romantic style and an expression of Romantic nationalism.

History
The foremost sources of inspiration for the Dragestil style were the Viking and medieval art and architecture of Scandinavia. It had roots in the preservation of stave churches and the recent excavation of historic relics such as the Tune, Gokstad and Oseberg ships.
<ref>[http://www.byggenytt.no/hovedstad/art_04/glott4.htm Huggenstensarkitektur og Dragestil (Brytningstid innen arkitekturen før og etter 1900 ved to av retningene)]</ref> 

It often featured Norse motifs, such as serpents and dragons, hence its popular appellation. Important proponents in the modern era included Norwegian architects Holm Hansen Munthe and Balthazar Lange.Arkitekter:Balthazar Conrad Lange (1854–1937) 

Characteristic features
 Exposed timber walls, often tarred on the exterior with varnished interiors
 Decoration in the form of dragon heads
 Often steep roofs and big eaves

 Gallery 

References

Other sources
 Tschudi-Madsen, Stephan (1981) Veien hjem, Norsk arkitektur 1870–1914   (Oslo: Norges kunsthistorie)  
 Tschudi-Madsen, Stephan  (1993) Dragestilen (Oslo: Honnør til en hånet stil)   
 Tschudi-Madsen, Stephan (1993) Vandringer på en utstilling og i en jaktvilla'' (Oslo: Honnør til en hånet stil)

External links
 Dragestil på St. Hanshaugen

Revival architectural styles
Architecture in Norway
 
Art Nouveau architecture